Sağırlar can refer to:

 Sağırlar, Ceyhan
 Sağırlar, Ilgaz